Anthony M. Duruji (born July 22, 1998) is an American professional basketball player for the Greensboro Swarm of the NBA G League. He played college basketball for the Louisiana Tech Bulldogs and the Florida Gators.

High school career
Duruji is a native of Germantown, Maryland, and played basketball at St. Andrew's Episcopal School in Potomac, Maryland. He reached the 1,000 career points mark in three seasons. Duruji was a nationally ranked triple jumper but chose to focus on his basketball career. He competed in the American Family Insurance High School Slam Dunk competition in 2017 and finished in second place. Duruji was recruited especially by college programs near his hometown but chose to commit to Louisiana Tech due to their coaching staff.

College career
As a freshman for the Bulldogs, Duruji became known for his athleticism. He was selected to the Conference USA All-Freshman team. Duruji averaged 12.2 points and 6.2 rebounds during his sophomore season.

Duruji transferred to the Florida Gators and sat out the 2019–20 season. He became a valuable contributor for the Gators after they lost forward Keyontae Johnson early in the 2020–21 season. Duruji started 17 of 25 games and averaged 6.1 points and 4.4 rebounds per game. He started alongside Colin Castleton in the low post during the 2021–22 season and averaged 8.6 points and 4.1 rebounds per game.

On April 1, 2022, Duruji declared for the 2022 NBA draft to forgo his final season of college eligibility.

Professional career

Greensboro Swarm (2022–present)
Duruji worked out for the Washington Wizards prior to the 2022 NBA draft but was not selected. He played with the Atlanta Hawks at the 2022 NBA Summer League.

On September 12, 2022, Duruji signed with the Charlotte Hornets. He appeared in two preseason games before he was waived on October 14, 2022. On November 4, 2022, Duruji was named to the opening night roster for the Greensboro Swarm.

Career statistics

College

|-
| style="text-align:left;"| 2017–18
| style="text-align:left;"| Louisiana Tech
| 32 || 19 || 21.3 || .451 || .394 || .597 || 4.1 || .8 || .4 || 1.4 || 7.2
|-
| style="text-align:left;"| 2018–19
| style="text-align:left;"| Louisiana Tech
| 33 || 33 || 29.9 || .468 || .339 || .673 || 6.2 || .9 || .9 || 1.2 || 12.2
|-
| style="text-align:left;"| 2019–20
| style="text-align:left;"| Florida
| style="text-align:center;" colspan="11"|  Redshirt
|-
| style="text-align:left;"| 2020–21
| style="text-align:left;"| Florida
| 25 || 17 || 22.0 || .438 || .263 || .483 || 4.4 || .6 || .6 || .4 || 6.1
|-
| style="text-align:left;"| 2021–22
| style="text-align:left;"| Florida
| 30 || 28 || 24.6 || .530 || .338 || .741 || 4.1 || 1.1 || .9 || .5 || 8.6
|- class="sortbottom"
| style="text-align:center;" colspan="2"| Career
| 120 || 97 || 24.6 || .472 || .342 || .649 || 4.7 || .9 || .7 || .9 || 8.7

Personal life
Duruji is the son of Esther Ibioha who participated in track, high jump and javelin for her home country of Nigeria.

References

External links
Florida Gators bio
Louisiana Tech Bulldogs bio

1998 births
Living people
21st-century African-American sportspeople
African-American basketball players
American men's basketball players
American sportspeople of Nigerian descent
Basketball players from Maryland
Greensboro Swarm players
Florida Gators men's basketball players
Louisiana Tech Bulldogs basketball players
People from Germantown, Maryland
Power forwards (basketball)
Small forwards